The Night Club is a 1925 American silent comedy film directed by Paul Iribe and Frank Urson and written by Cecil B. DeMille, Keene Thompson, Walter Woods, and William C. deMille. The film stars Raymond Griffith, Vera Reynolds, Wallace Beery, Louise Fazenda, and William Austin. The film was released on April 27, 1925, by Paramount Pictures.

Plot
A bitter bachelor and founder of a club, The Night Club, a free organization of unrepentant bachelors, Bob White finally decided to get married. But the wedding goes awry, because the bride leaves him alone at the foot of the altar. The bad experience makes him a misogynist and, when he learns that he can inherit a million dollars only if he marries this Grace Henderson, he prefers to give up that mountain of money in order not to get married. Some time later, Bob meets Grace by chance: ignoring who she really is, he falls in love with her. But the woman, having learned of Bob's identity, believing that he wants to marry her only to get hold of the inheritance, rejects him. Bob discovers that if he dies, the inheritance will go to Grace. He then decides to sacrifice himself and tries to kill himself, but his attempts, fortunately, all fail. Grace finally realizes Bob's true feelings and agrees to marry him.

Cast

 Raymond Griffith as Robert White
 Vera Reynolds as Grace Henderson
 Wallace Beery as Josy
 Louise Fazenda as Carmen
 William Austin as Gerl

uncredited
Edythe Chapman as Miss Perkins

Preservation
The Cineteca Del Friulli, Library of Congress, UCLA Film and Television Archive, George Eastman Museum, Pacific Film Archive all hold prints of this film.

References

External links

Lobby art, poster

1925 films
1920s English-language films
Silent American comedy films
1926 comedy films
1926 films
Paramount Pictures films
American black-and-white films
American silent feature films
1925 comedy films
Films directed by Frank Urson
Films directed by Paul Iribe
1920s American films